The 1981 Woodpecker Welsh Professional Championship was a professional non-ranking snooker tournament, which took place in February 1981.

Ray Reardon won the tournament defeating Cliff Wilson 9–6 in the final.

Main draw

References

Welsh Professional Championship
Welsh Professional Championship
Welsh Professional Championship
Welsh Professional Championship